The 1901 Oklahoma A&M Aggies football team represented Oklahoma A&M College in the 1901 college football season. This was the first year of football at A&M and the team didn't have a head coach. The Aggies played their home games in Stillwater, Oklahoma Territory. They finished the season 2–3.

Schedule

References

Oklahoma AandM
Oklahoma State Cowboys football seasons
Oklahoma AandM Aggies football team